The Aix Annunciation is a painting attributed to the Barthélemy d'Eyck or the so-called Master of the Annunciation of Aix-en-Provence. Executed in 1443-1445, it was originally placed in the Cathédrale Saint-Sauveur, Aix-en-Provence, southern France. Now it is divided between the Église de la Madeleine in the same city (central panel with the Annunciation), the Museum Boijmans Van Beuningen (part of the left panel with the prophet Isaiah) at Rotterdam, the Rijksmuseum of Amsterdam (upper part of the left panel), while the right panel is in the Royal Museum of Fine Arts of Belgium in Brussels. Side panels are painted on both sides, showing Christ on the right and Mary Magdalene on the left (the upper part, on reverse of the Amsterdam panel, does not survive); together they used to form a Noli me tangere scene when the triptych was folded shut.

History
The work was commissioned by Pierre Corpici, a cloth-merchant who knew Barthélemy's stepfather, and combines influences from the Early Netherlandish art of Robert Campin and Jan van Eyck with those of Claus Sluter who worked at Dijon, and Colantonio from Naples (although some see this last influence as flowing in the other direction). Many of the iconographic details follow those from Annunciations by Jan van Eyck and his circle, such as the Washington Annunciation. Together with a fine portrait dated 1456 (Lichtenstein Collection, Vienna), and a fragment with a small crucified Christ in the Louvre, this is the only surviving panel painting associated with Barthélemy d'Eyck; most of his later works are illuminated manuscripts commissioned by René of Anjou.

Description
The central panel depicts the Annunciation inside a Gothic church, the angel appearing under a vault. Above him, from a holed rose window, God and two angels are coming in, while the Madonna is kneeling at the right, with two painted naves in the background.

When used as an altarpiece, side panels of the triptych would be kept closed most of the time, displaying a Noli me tangere scene with kneeling Mary Magdalene on the left and Christ walking away from her on the right. The two panels do not form a continuous scene, however; Mary Magdalene is placed among lush green hills, while Christ is surrounded by a more desolate, desert-like landscape. Both Brussels and Rotterdam panels are painted on both sides, the reverse of the Amsterdam fragment does not survive.

The characters' sizes, like in other contemporary Flemish paintings, are not realistic if compared with the background, but are larger. The wide clothes show the inspiration by the Burgundian school. The light is of clearly Flemish derivation (Robert Campin), such as (although with some Provençal elements) the minute details, including the winged devil and the bat in the left arch.

See also
St. Jerome in His Study (Ghirlandaio)

Sources

References

External links

 Still life with books in a niche (upper left panel) at Rijksmuseum, Amsterdam.
 Isaiah and Mary Magdalene (lower left panel) at Museum Boijmans Van Beuningen, Rotterdam.
 Jeremiah and Christ (right panel) at Royal Museums of Fine Arts of Belgium, Brussels.

1443 paintings
1444 paintings
1445 paintings
Paintings in the collection of the Museum Boijmans Van Beuningen
Paintings in the collection of the Rijksmuseum
Triptychs
Renaissance paintings
Collections of the Royal Museums of Fine Arts of Belgium
Paintings depicting the Annunciation
Paintings depicting Jesus
Paintings depicting Mary Magdalene
Angels in art
Books in art